The 2019 Big East men's basketball tournament was the men's basketball postseason tournament for the Big East Conference. It was held from March 13 through March 16, 2019 at Madison Square Garden in New York City. Villanova defeated Seton Hall 74–72 to win the tournament, and the conference's automatic bid to the NCAA tournament. With the win, Villanova became the first team to win the Big East tournament three consecutive times.

Seeds
All 10 Big East schools participated in the tournament. Teams were seeded by conference record with tie-breaking procedures to determine the seeds for teams with identical conference records. The top six teams received first-round byes. Seeding for the tournament was determined at the close of the regular conference season.

Schedule

Bracket

*Indicates number of overtime periods.
Source

See also

2019 Big East women's basketball tournament

References

Tournament
Big East men's basketball tournament
Basketball competitions in New York City
College sports tournaments in New York City
Sports in Manhattan
Big East men's basketball tournament
Big East men's basketball tournament
2010s in Manhattan